The Men's 4 × 400 m relay athletics events for the 2012 Summer Paralympics took place at the London Olympic Stadium from 31 August to 8 September. One event was contested over this distance for two different classifications.

Results

T53/T54

References

Athletics at the 2012 Summer Paralympics
2012 in men's athletics